Weissenbach or Weißenbach may refer to the following places:

Places
municipalities in Austria:
Weißenbach am Lech, in Tyrol
Weißenbach an der Enns, in Styria
Weißenbach bei Liezen, in Styria
Gniebing-Weißenbach, in Styria
Weißenbach an der Triesting, in Lower Austria
 Weißenbach, a village in northern Italy
places in Switzerland:
Weissenbach, Berne, a place in the municipality of Boltigen
Weissenbach, Zurich, a place in the municipality of Bäretswil

Rivers and creeks
Weißenbach (Inn), a tributary of the Inn in Austria

People
Jean Weissenbach French geneticist